The Russian Blue Cat, commonly referred to as just Russian Blue, is a cat breed with colors that vary from a light shimmering silver to a darker, slate grey. The short, dense coat, which stands out from the body, has been the breed's hallmark for more than a century.

Origin 
The Russian Blue is a naturally occurring breed that may have originated in the port of Arkhangelsk in Russia. They are also sometimes called Archangel Blues. It is believed that sailors took them from the Archangel Isles to Great Britain and Northern Europe in the 1860s. The first reference to an Archangel Cat appears in British print in 1862. The first recorded appearance of one in a show was in 1872 at The Crystal Palace in England as the Archangel Cat.  However, Harrison Weir writing in 1895 reported that the early show cats under the Russian Blue name were British-bred grey tabbies, with separate grey cats arriving from Archangel in Britain in the 1800s with features consistent with the modern breed.   The Russian Blue competed in a class including all other blue cats until 1912, when it was given its own class. The breed was developed mainly in England and Scandinavia until after World War II.

Right after the war, a lack of numbers of Russian Blues led to cross breeding with the Siamese. Although Russian Blues were in the United States before the war, it was not until the post-war period that American breeders created the modern Russian Blue that is seen in the United States today. American breeders combined the bloodlines of both the Scandinavian and British Russian Blues. The Siamese traits have now largely been bred out. The short hair and slate-gray/blue color is often seen in mixed-breed cats, which can affect breeders and showers due to mislabeling a cat as a Russian Blue.

Russian Blues are plush short-haired, shimmering pale blue-gray cats with emerald green eyes. Guard hairs are distinctly silver-tipped giving the cat a silvery sheen or lustrous appearance. They have been used on a limited basis to create other breeds such as the Havana Brown or alter existing breeds such as the Nebelung. They are being used in Italy as a way to make Oriental Shorthairs healthier and more robust called RUS4OSH in FIFe.

Russian Whites and Russian Blacks were created from crosses with domestic white cats which were allegedly imported from Russia. The first line was developed by Frances McLeod (Arctic) in the United Kingdom during the 1960s and the second line produced by Dick and Mavis Jones (Myemgay) in Australia in the 1970s. By the late 1970s, the Russian White and Russian Black colors were accepted by cat fanciers in Australia as well as in South Africa and now also in the United Kingdom as Russian cats (in different classes). However, the Cat Fanciers' Association and FIFe does not recognize any variation of the Russian Blue.

Physical characteristics 

The Russian Blue has bright green eyes, pinkish lavender or mauve paws, two layers of short thick fur, and a blue-grey-black coat. The color is a bluish-gray that is the dilute expression of the black gene. However, as dilute genes are recessive ("d") and each parent will have a set of two recessive genes ("dd") two non-Color-Point Carrier (non-CPC) Russian Blues will always produce a blue cat. Due to the breeding with Siamese after World War II, there are color-point genes floating around. If two carriers are bred together, then they will produce a litter of mixed colors—solid blue or white with blue-point like a Siamese. People call these CPC cats "color-point", "whites" or "pointed" Russians. In most registries, one cannot register, breed or show a color-point Russian.  These color-point (blue-point) cats are called Color-Point-Russian Blue (Blue Point Russian Blue) or more informally as Pika Blu (or pika blue) cats and have the same general characteristics as the Russian Blue cats.

The coat is known as a "double coat", with the undercoat being soft, downy and equal in length to the guard hairs, which are an even blue with silver tips. However, the tail may have a few very dull, almost unnoticeable stripes. The coat is described as thick, plush and soft to the touch. The silver tips give the coat a shimmering appearance. Its eyes are almost always a dark and vivid green. Any white patches of fur or yellow eyes in adulthood are seen as flaws in show cats. Russian Blues should not be confused with British Blues (which are not a distinct breed, but rather a British Shorthair with a blue coat as the British Shorthair breed itself comes in a wide variety of colors and patterns), nor the Chartreux or Korat which are two other naturally occurring breeds of blue cats, although they have similar traits.

They are generally considered to be a quiet breed but there are always exceptions. They are normally reserved around strangers, unless they are brought up in an active household. Many Russian Blues have been trained to do tricks. They can also be fierce hunters, often catching rodents, birds, rabbits, small mammals, or reptiles. As loving and easy going as Russian Blues are, they do not like change, and prefer predictable, routine schedules.

Russian Blue kittens are energetic and require adequate playmates or toys as they can become mischievous if bored.  They have exceptional athleticism and rival even Abyssinians for their ability to leap and climb. Slow to mature, Russian Blues retain many of their adolescent traits both good and otherwise until they are 3–4 years old and even much older Blues can be easily enticed into play by their owners. Russian Blues are also highly intelligent. They have an excellent memory and will learn the hiding place of favorite toys (e.g., laser pointers) and lead their owners to them when they want a game. They also have a keen ability to remember favorite visitors and will race to greet familiar faces even if quite some time has passed between visits—a radical departure from their normally very reserved behavior around unfamiliar people.

Growth and maturity 

Russian Blues have a life expectancy of around 10–20 years, but some have lived 25 years. They usually have few health issues as they tend to have little to no genetic problems and are not prone to illness. They are small to moderate-sized cats with an average weight of  when fully grown. Males will typically be larger than females. Their gestation period is approximately 64 days.

Allergies 

Anecdotal evidence suggests that the Russian Blue may be better tolerated by individuals with mild to moderate allergies. There is speculation that the Russian Blue produces less glycoprotein Fel d 1, one source of cat allergies. The thicker coat may also trap more of the allergens closer to the cat's skin. Glycoprotein is one source of cat allergies, but this does not mean that all allergies will be stopped. You can still get allergies, just nowhere near as extreme, and for a much less amount of time than other cat breeds. Because of this, Russian Blues are very popular with people with allergies all around the world.

In popular culture 
 
 Arlene is portrayed by a Russian Blue in Garfield: The Movie.
 Felicity, a character in the novel and film Felidae, was a Russian Blue.
 A Russian Blue kitten is a trained assassin in the Cats & Dogs film. According to audio commentary on the DVD, several kittens were used due to the kittens growing faster than the filming schedule. Catherine from its sequel Cats & Dogs: The Revenge of Kitty Galore is also a Russian Blue.
 Eben and Snooch are Russian Blues in the comic Two Lumps.
 The Nyan Cat meme was inspired by creator Chris Torres' Russian Blue Marty. Marty died in 2012 from feline infectious peritonitis.
 Tom Cat of the Hanna-Barbera cartoon-produced for MGM Tom and Jerry is said to have been inspired by a Russian Blue. 
 In A Gentleman in Moscow by Amor Towles, the Metropol Hotel's lobby cat is a Russian Blue.
 Smokey, the main antagonist in the film Stuart Little, is a Russian Blue.

See also 

 Nebelung, a moderately-long haired breed which used the Russian Blue as an outcross
 Russian White, Black, and Tabby

References

External links 

 Breed profile and Russian Blue Breed Standard at Cat Fanciers' Association
 Interactive CFA Russian Blue Standards and scoring
 CFA Russian Blue Breed Council
 Russian Blue Information
 Russian Blue Cattery
 Russian Blue Cat Breed Guide

Cat breeds
Natural cat breeds
Cat breeds originating in Russia